Carl Robert Byoir (1886 — 3 February 1957) was an influential practitioner in the field of public relations. He created and organized one of the world's largest public relations firms in 1930.

Early life
Byoir was born to Jewish immigrant parents from Poland but raised in Des Moines, Iowa. Byoir started his career in public relations at 14 as a reporter for The Des Moines Register.  At the age of 17, Byoir became the editor of the Waterloo Times-Tribune. He worked his way through the University of Iowa while he was the circulation manager for Hearst Magazine's publications.

Career
In 1917, Byoir became a member of the Committee on Public Information, which publicly organized the United States propaganda campaign for World War I.

In 1921, Byoir began working in advertising and sales, when E. Virgil Neal, at Nuxated Iron, hired Byoir as a salesman. At first, Byoir worked for Nuxated Iron without pay; however, within weeks, Byoir was hired as the vice-president and the general manager of the company because sales increased so significantly. He worked for Neal from 1921 to 1929.

In 1930, Byoir leased two Cuban newspapers, the Havana Post and the Havana Telegram. Byoir wanted to increase the circulation of the newspaper in Cuba by increasing the number of American tourists to Cuba. He became an influential intermediary for Americans wishing to invest in Cuba.

Byoir continued to lead a few other public relation campaigns but his next notable campaign was with the Franklin D. Roosevelt administration planning many charity balls for the President and helping establishing the March of Dimes foundation. Byoir's office was at 10 East 40th Street in New York, and from there he pursued his work in public relations, working with many other companies including the German Tourist Information Office, Freeport Sulphur Company, Crosley Motors, and Eastern Railroads.

One of his most noteworthy campaigns was conducted on behalf of The Great Atlantic and Pacific Tea Company (A&P), a grocery company that was the world's largest retailer by far. In 1937, A&P, which had never engaged in political matters before, hired Byoir to help it fight the powerful anti-chain-store movement, which sought to break up big chains in order to protect independent retailers and wholesalers. Working behind the scenes, Byoir organized a campaign to highlight the benefits of chains in reducing consumer prices. The campaign burst into public view on September 15, 1938, when 1,600 publications ran a full-page advertisement headlined "A Statement of Public Policy by the Great Atlantic & Pacific Tea Company." The advertisement criticized a bill introduced by U.S. Rep. Wright Patman of Texas to impose punitive taxes on chain stores. The bill was blocked, and the power of the anti-chain movement began to wane. Byoir remained an influential advisor to A&P for many years.

Byoir died in 1957. His company continued to grow before being acquired by Hill & Knowlton.

See also 
CPI added December 29, 2012

Footnotes

References 
 Anon, "Carl Byoir Dead; Publicist was 68; Creator of Birthday Balls to Fight Polio Collected 'a Million in One Night'. Started as a Newsman. Propaganda Aide of U.S. in World War I; Directed 'War Against Depression'; Distributed Films Here; Cleared of Nazi Charge" (Obituary), New York Times, (4 February 1957), p. 18.
 The Museum of Public Relations Biography: Carl R. Byoir
 Conroy, M.S., The Cosmetics Baron You've Never Heard Of: E. Virgil Neal and Tokalon, Altus History LLC, (Englewood), 2009. 
 Levinson, Marc. The Great A&P and the Struggle for Small Business in America, (New York: Hill and Wang, 2011).
 Chicago Tribune Orbituary

1886 births
1957 deaths
American public relations people
American people of Polish-Jewish descent
Public relations pioneers